Noa Diorgina Man (born 11 December 2004) is a Dutch freerunner and traceur. She is a two-time medalist at the World Games.

Biography
Man began her career in freerunning and parkour when she was 12 years old. When she was 13 years of age, she became senior national champion. In 2021, she won the Red Bull Art of Motion. At the Parkour competitions at the 2022 World Games, she won the gold medal in the freestyle event and the silver medal in the speedrun event.

References

2004 births
Living people
Sportspeople from Delft
Dutch sportswomen
Freerunners
Traceurs
Competitors at the 2022 World Games
World Games gold medalists
World Games silver medalists